

Results

Seats versus vote share

References

Regional and municipal elections in Colombia
2015 in Colombia